Ortovero is a comune (municipality) in the Province of Savona in the Italian region Liguria, located about  southwest of Genoa and about  southwest of Savona.

Ortovero borders the following municipalities: Albenga, Arnasco, Casanova Lerrone, Onzo, Vendone, and Villanova d'Albenga.

References

Cities and towns in Liguria